Jefferson Avenue may refer to:
 Jefferson Avenue (Detroit), Michigan
 Jefferson Avenue (St. Louis), Missouri
 Jefferson Avenue (Staten Island Railway station), New York

See also 
 Jefferson Avenue Historic District (disambiguation)